Ambrì-Piotta railway station is a railway station in the Swiss canton of Ticino and municipality of Quinto. It takes its name from the nearby communities of Ambrì and Piotta. The station is on the original line of the Swiss Federal Railways Gotthard railway, on the southern ramp up to the Gotthard Tunnel. Most trains on the Gotthard route now use the Gotthard Base Tunnel and do not pass through Ambrì-Piotta station.

Services 
 the following services stop at Ambrì-Piotta:

The station is also served by an hourly Autopostale bus service between Bellinzona and Airolo that parallels the railway line.

References

External links 
 
 

Railway stations in Ticino
Swiss Federal Railways stations